Jonathan Liew (born 1985) is a sports writer for The Guardian. Liew has been named the sports writer of the year, and sports columnist of the year, at the annual SJA Awards.

Journalism career
Liew started in 2009 on the Daily Telegraph graduate training scheme after being named the 2007 Student Columnist of the Year in The Guardian'''s Student Media Awards while a student at the University of Edinburgh.  He became a feature writer and columnist at the Daily Telegraph, where he was named as the 2011 Sports Journalists Association "young sports writer of the year". At the Telegraph, Liew estimated he covered at least 39 sports on five different continents and developed a fondness for rugby league. 

Liew moved to The Independent in June 2017 and as part of his role Liew featured regularly as a pundit on 'The Indy Football Podcast' which was nominated for best podcast at the 2017 Football Supporters Federation awards.  Liew has also guested on podcasts such as Second Captains and The Anfield Wrap.

In October 2019, it was announced that Liew had joined The Guardian.

Liew has appeared on Sky Sports television programmes Sunday Supplement, World Cup Supplement, and Cricket Writers on TV.

Liew contributes columns to the cricket almanac Wisden he has written for Prospect and the Belfast Telegraph.

Liew has received praise from his peers for the way he has spoken out on racial issues within sport. He is a "Raise Your Game" mentor for the Kick It Out campaign.

On 31 October 2018, it was announced that Liew had been nominated in the "writer for the year" category at the 2018 Football Supporters Federation Awards.

On 31 January 2019 Liew was shortlisted for the football journalist of the year award and on 26 February 2019 won the sports columnist of the year award at the SJA awards. In September of that year, Liew spoke out on the issue of under representation of British Asians in professional football in England, stating that he believed that the issue began at grassroots level.

In May 2021, he wrote an article in defence of tennis player Naomi Osaka after she decided to skip press conferences at the Roland Garros tennis tournament citing mental wellbeing. The article was headlined "We're not the good guys", and questioned the value of sports press conferences.

Liew was shortlisted for the Writer of the Year at the Football Supporters' Association awards in 2020 and 2021. In September 2022 he was nominated for "Sports Journalist of the Year" at The Press Awards.

Other writing
In December 2020 Liew was announced as being co-writer, with fellow Guardian sports journalist Barney Ronay, of The Red Zone, a Netflix comedy series centred around the world
of football. In March 2022 the project was announced as discontinued.

Personal life
Liew graduated from the University of Edinburgh with a degree in History. He appeared as a contestant on the Channel 4 television quiz show Countdown'' in 2013, becoming an "octochamp" by winning eight episodes in a row.

References

Living people
British sportswriters
1985 births
English podcasters